The Friday the 13th mini-crash was a stock market crash that occurred on Friday, October 13, 1989. The crash, referred to by some as "Black Friday", was apparently caused by a reaction to a news story of the breakdown of a $6.75 billion leveraged buyout deal for UAL Corporation, the parent company of United Airlines. When the UAL deal fell through, it helped trigger the collapse of the junk bond market. The deal unraveled because the Association of Flight Attendants pulled out of the deal when management, in negotiations over an Employee Stock Ownership Plan (ESOP) designed to fund the leveraged buyout, refused to agree to terms.

The close
Moments after the UAL deal fell through, the indices began their plunge. When the closing bell rang, the Dow Jones Industrial Average had dropped 190.58 points, or 6.91 percent, to 2,569.26; the NASDAQ Composite had shed 14.90 points, or 3.09 percent, to 467.30; and the S&P 500 Index had fallen 21.74 points, or 6.12 percent, to 333.65. The Dow Jones Transportation Average fell 78.05 (5.26%) on the 13th, and fell another 102.04 (7.26%) on the 16th for a total decline of 12.13%. The major indices had closed at all-time highs as recently as Monday, October 9.

Survey
Many investors were left stunned. Since most market participants blame the UAL deal as the culprit, survey researcher William Feltus and Robert Shiller, the author of Irrational Exuberance, conducted a telephone survey of 101 market professionals in the business days following the crash, asking if they had heard about the UAL news before or after the crash: 36% surveyed said they had heard about it before the losses set in, and 53% said afterwards.

The market professionals also believed that the UAL story was just an attention-grabber, with traders trying to find a reason to sell: 50 percent believed that was the reason while 30 percent believed the news would reduce future takeovers.

Aftermath
The crash is often pinpointed as the start of the early 1990s recession, but the surprisingly-low growth rates (almost 0 percent) during the summer months and the savings and loan crisis earlier in the year had triggered the crisis almost concurrently with the mini-crash, which, in turn, got blamed by the public (the memory of the 1987 crash still being fresh) as the true culprit of the recession.

See also
 Black Monday (October 19, 1987)

References

1989 in economics
1989 in the United States
Stock market crashes
October 1989 events in the United States
Friday the 13th